Sokolniki  is a village in Wieruszów County, Łódź Voivodeship, in central Poland. It is the seat of the gmina (administrative district) called Gmina Sokolniki.

The town has an approximate population of 1,200.

References

Wieruszów County